Xenon fluoride nitrate, also known as fluoroxenonium nitrate, is the chemical compound with formula FXeONO2.

Synthesis 
This compound is formed via the reaction:

 [FXeOXeFXeF][AsF6] + 2NO2F → FXeONO2 + NO2AsF6.

Purification of FXeONO2 can then take place by dissolving in SO2ClF, which leaves the nitronium arsenic hexafluoride behind as a solid.

An alternate low yield method to make FXeONO2 is to dissolve xenon difluoride in liquid dinitrogen tetroxide at 0 °C.

 XeF2 + NO+ + NO3− → FXeONO2 + NOF

This method is inefficient as not much nitrate ion exists in the liquid and the xenon fluoride nitrate decomposes.

Another method claimed to make this substance is:

 XeF2 + HNO3 → FXeONO2 + HF

Properties 
FXeONO2 is a white crystalline material. The space group of the crystals is P21/c, which is monoclinic. The unit cell contains four molecules with a total volume of 386.6 Å3. The unit cell dimensions are a = 4.6663 Å, b = 8.799 Å c = 9.415 Å, with non-perpendicular angle β = 90.325°. With a molecular weight of 212.3, the crystal has density 3.648. (These measurements at -173 °C.)
The bond lengths in the molecule are 1.992 Å for Xe–F, 2.126 Å for Xe–O, 1.36 Å for O–NO2, 1.199 for N–Ocis and 1.224 Å for N–Otrans. The bond angles are 177.6° for F–Xe–O, 114.7° for Xe-O-N, 114.5° for (Xe)O–N–Ocis, 118.4° for (Xe)O–N–Otrans and 127.1° for Ocis–N–Otrans. The bond lengths and angles on the xenon atom are similar to that in FXeOSO2F and FXeOTeF5, indicating a polar oxygen bond. The Xe–O–N angle is larger than those in halogen nitrates, which indicates a lower bond density for the Xe–O bond. The N–Ocis bond length is longer than the N–Otrans bond length, opposite to other halogen nitrates.

FXeONO2 is not particularly stable and slowly breaks down at -78 °C, yielding XeF2·N2O4. This happens on a timescale of several days. At 0 °C, FXeONO2 has a half life of seven hours, decomposing to XeF2.

References 

Xenon(II) compounds
Nitrates
Fluorides